Sandra Lewis (born Sandra Louise Allen; 11 October 1978 in Sydney, Australia) is a softball player from Australia, who won a silver medal at the 2004 Summer Olympics, and bronze medals at the 2000 and 2008 Summer Olympics.

In 2003 she was named Co-Big Ten Player of the Week, when playing for Michigan State.

An alumni from Michigan State University, Sandy Lewis was a Third-Team All-American center fielder for the Spartans. Throughout her college career she earned Co-Big Ten Player of the Week and Big Ten Player of the Week honors. Sandy Lewis also helped break the 5-year winning streak University of Michigan had over Michigan State in 2003, with a walk-off two-run home run in the bottom of the fifth inning. She ended up in fourth place with her batting average, which was a .400 for the Big Ten Conference. In 2003, Sandy Lewis was also named in the Verizon Academic All-America Softball University Division First Team. Lewis's overall GPA was a 3.63 majoring in Human Biology. As an elite player for the Spartans she led Michigan State on-base percentage (.472), runs batted in (37), runs (39), Batting average (.369) and tying for first in hits (65). She was awarded first-team in the All-Great Lakes Region, first-team All-Big Ten along with the NCAA Region 2 All-Tournament team.

References

External links
 Queensland Academy of Sport profile

1978 births
Australian Institute of Sport softball players
Australian softball players
Living people
Olympic softball players of Australia
Softball players at the 2000 Summer Olympics
Softball players at the 2004 Summer Olympics
Softball players at the 2008 Summer Olympics
Olympic silver medalists for Australia
Olympic bronze medalists for Australia
Sportswomen from New South Wales
Olympic medalists in softball
Medalists at the 2008 Summer Olympics
Medalists at the 2004 Summer Olympics
Sportspeople from Sydney
Medalists at the 2000 Summer Olympics
Michigan State Spartans softball players